This is a dairy goat breed found throughout Hungary. The Hungarian Improved originated from Swiss Dairy breeds, especially Saanen, crossed with local animals. They are found in black, white, red or cream.

References

Sources
Hungarian Improved Goat

Goat breeds
Dairy goat breeds
Goat breeds originating in Hungary